The Rural Connectivity Group (RCG) is a joint venture by New Zealand’s mobile network operators – Vodafone, Spark, 2degrees. Crown Infrastructure Partners
has contracted with the Rural Connectivity Group to bring 4G mobile and wireless broadband coverage to rural New Zealand under the Rural Broadband Initiative Phase Two and the Mobile Black Spot Fund.

The RCG will build a minimum of 400 new mobile cell-sites, delivering high speed wireless broadband to at least 30,000 additional rural New Zealand households. This will increase New Zealand’s mobile land coverage area by up to 25 per cent, and deliver mobile calling and data service to a further potential 780 kilometres of New Zealand’s state highways. It aims to provide high-speed broadband to the greatest possible number of rural users and improve mobile on state highways and at key visitor destinations.

All three mobile network operators will share spectrum, network equipment and have one set of antennae on each tower, using Multi Operator Core Network (MOCN) technology.

Coverage and rollout

As of June 2018 one site had been installed at Haast on the West coast of the South Island. It was fast tracked due to lobbying from locals citing safety issues. It is only 3G initially (with satellite back-haul) and will be later upgraded to 4G when suitable infrastructure is available.

The original contract builds were due for completion by the end of 2022 however the new schedule (May 2018) aims to have them substantially finished by the end of 2021 – a year earlier than previously planned.

References

Internet in New Zealand